Nimble may refer to:

 HMS Nimble, the name of several Royal Navy vessels
 RMAS Nimble (A222), a British naval auxiliary ship
 USS Nimble, the name of two US Navy vessels
 Castle Nimble, a castle in Wales
 Camp Nimble, a US Army post in South Korea
 Nimble Storage, an enterprise data storage company

See also
 Nymble (disambiguation)